Joice dos Santos Coelho (born 1 April 1993) is a Brazilian basketball player for São José Desportivo and the Brazilian national team, where she participated at the 2014 FIBA World Championship.

References

1993 births
Living people
Brazilian women's basketball players
Power forwards (basketball)
Basketball players at the 2010 Summer Youth Olympics
Small forwards
Basketball players from Rio de Janeiro (city)